Damian Keeley (born 14 February 1963) is an English former professional footballer, born in Salford, who played in the Football League for Torquay United.

Keeley, a forward, joined Frank O'Farrell's Torquay United in September 1981, making his debut, as a substitute for Willie Young, on 27 March 1982 in a 2–1 home win against Rochdale. With Torquay in a mid-table position with nothing to play for, Keeley made a further appearance as a substitute (this time replacing Martin Musgrove) in the penultimate game of the season (a 2–0 defeat away to Port Vale) and started the final game of the season, a 1–1 draw away to Darlington.

He was released at the end of the season, joining non-league club Teignmouth.

References

1963 births
Living people
Footballers from Salford
English footballers
Association football forwards
Torquay United F.C. players
English Football League players